After the Verdict is a 1929 British-German drama film directed by Henrik Galeen and starring Olga Tschechowa and Warwick Ward. In the film, an aristocrat is accused of murdering his lover. It was based on the 1924 novel of the same title by Robert Hichens. It was made as an independent film at British International Pictures' Elstree Studios. It is now considered a lost film. It was Galeen's penultimate film as a director, after returning to Germany he directed the thriller The House of Dora Green (1933).

Cast

References

Bibliography

External links

1929 films
1929 drama films
1929 lost films
British drama films
1920s English-language films
Films directed by Henrik Galeen
British silent feature films
Films based on British novels
Films set in England
Films shot at British International Pictures Studios
Lost British films
German drama films
German silent feature films
Films of the Weimar Republic
British black-and-white films
German black-and-white films
Tennis films
Bavaria Film films
Lost German films
Lost drama films
1920s British films
Silent drama films
1920s German films